Glendale Secondary School is located at 145 Rainbow Drive in Hamilton, Ontario.  The school was founded in 1959 and is a part of the Hamilton-Wentworth District School Board. The school is located close to the Hamilton suburb of Stoney Creek, Ontario and services students from there as well as the East Hamilton Region.  There are roughly 1200 students enrolled at Glendale from dozens of language and cultural groups.

Curriculum
Students at Glendale undergo a typical Ontario high school curriculum and are offered courses in departments including business, technology (wood shop, automotive and computer science), arts (music, drama and dance), math, science (physics, chemistry and biology) and languages (French), English, history, physical education, and geography.

Program Highlights and Student Support Programs

 On and off campus Alternative Education programs
 Complete-a-credit/Credit Recovery programs (non-credit summer programs)
 Experiential Learning program
 At-chicken coop program
 Caring Adult Program
 Transition Support
 Sheltered Instruction
 AWE
 Learning Resource
 ESL Resource
 After school literacy
 Math Lab
 Full range of academic and optional courses, including OSSLC
 Full range ELL program, including Sheltered Instruction
 Pathways programs leading to apprenticeships, articulation with Mohawk College or certification
 Full range Co-operative education/ Experiential Learning program
 Interdisciplinary Studies courses
 Bullying Awareness and Prevention Week

School clubs / Supporters
 Science Club
 Homework Club
 Student Activity Council (SAC)
 Leaders Today
 Current Affairs
 Baseball
 Basketball
 Cricket
 Cross country
 Soccer
 Track and field
 Tennis
Badminton
Floor Hockey
Football
Ultimate Disc
Pickleball

Overview
Glendale Secondary School has enjoyed a strong enrolment in its music program for several decades. The band has travelled to various locations to perform, including, but not limited to: Walt Disney World, Florida (8 times), Disneyland (4 times), New Orleans (3 times), New York City, Washington D.C., Boston, Atlanta, San Diego, Bermuda, Japan, Virginia Beach, Williamsburg, VA, Chicago and Cleveland.  More recently, the conductor's baton has been taken up by Glendale band alumnus.

Glendale High School Website

Glendale Secondary also has two school websites that can be accessed, the first being through the TVDSB website and the second being through HWDSB. The website through TVDSB provides information stemming from the years 2019-2021 along with specific months and dates can be found surrounding the highlights of the school. The months provided also state the amount of information that can be found within each month. The information varies from programs and courses provided to parent-teacher meeting nights and school formals. Most of the information provided is for the benefit of the students who are currently enrolled, plan on being enrolled and parents of students in order to stay up to date with the latest news about the high school.

The second website provided for Glendale's updates is through the HWDSB portal. The HWDSB website provides more insight regarding school policies, calendars, transportation, student absence as well as contact information. The website also holds sections specific to relevant news and events that pertain to the school with dates attached.

Glendale's Special Olympics

Along with several programs and courses provided throughout Glendale, the Secondary school also provides an annual Special Olympics event. The event focuses on providing Thames Valley students with developmental disabilities the ability to participate in an athletic event hosted at the TD Waterhouse Stadium. The event provides challenges involving track and field events along with various other modified activities such as wheelchair races that students can participate in.

In the theatre

The movie Detention starring Dolph Lundgren was shot at Glendale during the summer of 2002. The film portrayed the school as an inner-city school located in the north-eastern United States, and focused on its position as a central location involved in the distribution of hard drugs. Along with film portray among the school, Glendale has also held numerous musical theatre plays that have gotten recognition across Ontario such as Tarzan (2015). Many of the students involved in the musical are vocally trained, providing high levels of performance among Glendale's theatre. Due to such high-performance rates among the students, many seniors have received offers from various post-secondary performing arts programs which they were able pursue after graduation.

Glendale Bears Football
The Glendale Bears are known for their sports teams among football and basketball. The Senior boys' football team has had enormous growth within specific seasons. In 2017, the senior boys' football team held a first-place record as well as a 4-0 record among Division II action. During this season, the Bears also outscored apposing teams 71 to 15, creating a huge win for the team.

Glendale Hall of Fame

Glendale has also had a high success rate surrounding alumni who have pursued their sports career outside the high school. In May 2012, the second annual hall of fame night was hosted for the schools Athletic Hall of Fame, where four new members were inducted. The four new members that were inducted consisted of Ruby Florio (football), Donna Forbes (hockey), Frank Marof (football) and Jean Donaldson (field hockey/badminton).

Notable alumni
Ian Astbury Lead singer of the 1980s rock band The Cult, attended the school after his family moved from the U.K. to Hamilton when he was 11.
Wayne Boden, serial killer
Milan Borjan, goalkeeper for Canada men's national soccer team
Rudy Florio player and coach, went on with a 8 year career in the CFL.
Rob Hitchcock, football player.

See also
List of high schools in Ontario

References

Sources

External links
 

Educational institutions established in 1959
High schools in Hamilton, Ontario
1959 establishments in Ontario